Hellfire, in comics, may refer to:

Hellfire, a member of the Elementals
Hellfire (J. T. Slade), the grandson of the Phantom Rider and a member of the Secret Warriors
Hellfire, the alter ego of Mikal Drakonmegas who has appeared in Terror Inc.
Hellfire Club (comics), a Marvel Comics supervillain team

See also
Hellfire (disambiguation)

References